Paraleprodera flavoplagiata is a species of beetle in the family Cerambycidae that was described by Stephan von Breuning in 1938.

References

Lamiini
Beetles described in 1938